Nicole Muller (born ) was a Brazilian group rhythmic gymnast. She represented her nation at international competitions.

She participated at the 2008 Summer Olympics in Beijing. 
She also competed at world championships, including at the 2005 World Rhythmic Gymnastics Championships, and 2007 World Rhythmic Gymnastics Championships.

See also
List of Olympic rhythmic gymnasts for Brazil

References

External links

1989 births
Living people
Brazilian rhythmic gymnasts
Place of birth missing (living people)
Gymnasts at the 2008 Summer Olympics
Olympic gymnasts of Brazil
Pan American Games medalists in gymnastics
Pan American Games gold medalists for Brazil
South American Games gold medalists for Brazil
South American Games medalists in gymnastics
Gymnasts at the 2007 Pan American Games
Competitors at the 2006 South American Games
Medalists at the 2007 Pan American Games
People from Toledo, Paraná
Sportspeople from Paraná (state)
20th-century Brazilian women
21st-century Brazilian women